Fawzia Mirza is a Canadian-born film and TV writer and director. She is known for her works such as web series Kam Kardashian, Brown Girl Problems and the film Signature Move (2017).

Early life  
Mirza's parents were born in India and migrated to Pakistan. She was born in London, Ontario, Canada. She grew up in Sydney, Nova Scotia.

Eventually, her family moved to Indiana, where she finished high school before relocating to Chicago.

Film & Web Series
Mirza majored in English and political science at Indiana University in Bloomington, Indiana and then moved to Chicago for law school at Chicago-Kent College of Law. After two and a half years of working as a litigator, she changed professions to become an actor. She has focused on projects relating to the LGBT community, particularly relating to being a queer Muslim woman, "to gain visibility for women and Brown performers, and find space for queer stories".

Her first short film The Queen of My Dreams she co-wrote, co-directed with collaborator Ryan Logan. As a young girl, Fawzia Mirza fell under the spell of Bollywood heroines and their promise of love and feminine perfection. As an adult, she looks back and re-imagines the epic romance in the classic film Aradhana, in a queer light.

Her one-woman show Me, My Mom and Sharmila explores growing up queer and South Asian; in 2015 she performed it at the International Theatre Festival at the National College of Arts in Lahore. Also in 2015, she appeared in Emmy-nominated Her Story, a six-part series on the lives of trans and queer women. Mirza plays Ayesha Ali Trump, a fictional Muslim daughter of Donald Trump, in the mockumentary The Muslim Trump Documentary. She has made a number of award-winning short films including The First Session, Spunkle, Reclaiming Pakistan, The Streets Are Ours, Saya and I Know Her..

In 2016, she announced her film Signature Move (2017) starring Shabana Azmi in the role of her mother. Fawzia produced, starred in and co-wrote with Lisa Donato. The film world premiered at SXSW and won over 14 awards all over the world, including the Jury Prize for US Narrative at Outfest, Best Narrative Film at Columbus International, Best Director and Best Actress at Out San Diego, Audience Award for Best Narrative in Connecticut, and Mirza won a Jury prize at the Canadian South Asian Mosaic Film Festival. The film was inspired by her actual ex-girlfriend and their relationship in the city of Chicago.

She wrote for the CBS show The Red Line executive produced by Ava Duvernay and Greg Berlanti. Her episode marked the first instance of a gay-Muslim romance on network television.

In 2020, her feature screenplay adaptation of Me, My Mom & Sharmila was accepted into the Toronto International Film Festival Writers Studio and Filmmaker Lab. She was one of five women selected to FUSE 2, Paul Feig's writer/director incubator program and will develop a short film with Powderkeg in 2021. In 2021, she was added to Peter Luo's Starlight Media's Stars Collective.

Filmography

References

External links
Official Website

Living people
Year of birth missing (living people)
Canadian film actresses
Queer women
Pakistani emigrants to Canada
Pakistani lesbian actresses
Pakistani lesbian writers
Pakistani LGBT comedians
LGBT Muslims
Canadian Muslims
Muslim female comedians
Canadian stage actresses
21st-century Canadian women writers
21st-century Canadian dramatists and playwrights
21st-century Canadian actresses
Canadian women dramatists and playwrights
Canadian lesbian actresses
Canadian lesbian writers
Canadian LGBT comedians
Film directors from Ontario
LGBT film directors
Canadian women film directors
Asian-Canadian filmmakers
21st-century Canadian LGBT people